Catherine Lee (born 1950 in Pampa, Texas) is an American painter, sculptor and printmaker. Her works, featuring repetitive forms in various materials (including canvas, bronze, iron, glass, and ceramics) have been described as minimalist and structuralist.

Biography 
Lee grew up in Pampa, Texas. She studied at San Jose State University in San Jose, California, where she earned a bachelor's degree in studio art in 1974. Lee was married to abstract artist Sean Scully from 1978 to 1998.  She lived in New York City for 32 years and returned to Texas in late 1990s, settling in the Hill Country near Austin. Some of her work is currently held and can be seen in the collections of New York's Museum of Modern Art, the Carnegie Museum in Pittsburgh, and the Houston Museum of Fine Arts. Some of her sculptures are also available for purchase on Artnet.

Work 
Catherine Lee's sculptures (as small as a fist or as large as a sedan standing on end) are faceted polyhedra or polygons made from cast metal or clay. Hung on the wall, freestanding, or situated on plain steel pedestals or shelves — "some are singular works, others are grids of dozens of nearly identical, handmade components". She would personally describe herself as an abstract artist because she has such a strong personal attachment to abstraction, explaining how her work "refers to things in the world tangentially, but it’s not at all representational." She creates both paintings and sculptures, but doesn't have a preference for one over the other. She thinks of painting as more emotionally engaging, whereas she thinks of sculpture-making as problem-solving. 

Lee held her first solo exhibition in 1977 at the Duffy-Gibbs Gallery in New York City, and her work has been subsequently displayed in several public and private collections. A Los Angeles Times review of her 1988 solo exhibition at Michael Maloney Gallery describes her work as small, quirky wall pieces consisting of oddly shaped, individually colored or bronze elements that nestle closely together, often in a jigsaw fashion. She often utilizes black and monochrome colors in her works because she appreciates the hostility these colors can bring to each piece.

In 2012, she was the featured artist of the West Texas Triangle, group of five art museums in western Texas. Her work Unica 39 (1987), an "abstract monotype in color", is a part of the permanent exhibition in the Tate Gallery. Lee's favored method of making ceramic artwork is Raku due to the original and how it is highly impossible to reproduce the same result again.

Teaching 
Lee has taught at Princeton University (1980), Rochester Institute of Technology (1982), the University of Texas at San Antonio (1983) and (2000), and Columbia University (1986–1987).

Collections 
Indianapolis Museum of Art
Museum of Fine Arts, Houston 
Tate Gallery, London 
The Metropolitan Opera, 
Museum of Modern Art
Lora Reynolds gallery
Nasher Sculpture Center, Dallas

Solo exhibitions 
A list of Catherine Lee's exhibitions taken from the book Catherine Lee, the Alphabet Series and Other Works by the Pamela Auchincloss Gallery.

Early life 
Growing up, Lee had her first experience with art in the third grade when she was living in Germany at an army base. She attended a local art museum in Kaiserslautern, and explains how she was "stunned by the sense of quiet, of reverence." She spent the majority of her career living and working in New York, NY.

References

External links
 Catherine Lee home page

1950 births
American contemporary painters
American women painters
People from Pampa, Texas
20th-century American women artists
Living people
21st-century American women artists